is a 2012 Japanese drama film adaptation of a novel of the same name written by Misumi Kubo. It was released in Japan on 17 November. The film stars Kento Nagayama as Takumi Saito, the lead hero; Tomoko Tabata as Satomi Okamoto (Anzu), the lead heroine; Masataka Kubota as Ryota Fukuda; Takahiro Miura as Yoshifumi Taoka. The film was directed by Yuki Tanada.

Reception
Tomoko Tabata won the 67th Mainichi Film Award for Best Actress for her role in the film.

References

External links
  
 

Works by Yuki Tanada
2010s Japanese films
2010s Japanese-language films